Cumberland House is a mansion in London, England.

Cumberland House may also refer to:

 Cumberland House, York, a building in England
 Cumberland House, Saskatchewan, a town and former fur trading post in Canada
 Cumberland House Provincial Park, an historic park in Saskatchewan
 Cumberland House Cree Nation, an Indian reserve in Saskatchewan